Bobby and the Midnites was a rock group led by Bob Weir of the Grateful Dead.  The band was Weir's main side project during the first half of the 1980s.  They released two albums, but were better known for their live concerts than for their work in the recording studio.  With a rhythm section that included jazz veterans Billy Cobham and, for a time, Alphonso Johnson, Bobby and the Midnites played rock music that was influenced by jazz-rock fusion.

History of the Band

In 1978, Bob Weir had led a side project called the Bob Weir Band that played a number of concerts.  Besides Weir himself, two members of the Bob Weir Band were in Bobby and the Midnites.  One was guitarist and singer Bobby Cochran (Eddie Cochran's nephew), formerly of Steppenwolf.  The other was keyboardist and singer Brent Mydland, who in the interim had joined the Grateful Dead.  Matthew Kelly was another "Midnite" who had already played in a band with Weir — Kingfish, which Kelly and Dave Torbert had founded in 1973, and which Weir had played in full-time from 1974 to 1976.  Kelly played guitar, harmonica, and congas.  Tim Bogert, who had previously been in Vanilla Fudge and Beck, Bogert & Appice, was recruited to play bass guitar.  The Midnites' drummer was Billy Cobham, a highly regarded jazz and fusion musician who had played with Miles Davis and the Mahavishnu Orchestra, among others.

The first Bobby and the Midnites concert was at the Golden Bear, in Huntington Beach, California, on June 30, 1980.  The band played a number of live dates from mid-1980 to early 1981.  Then Alphonso Johnson replaced Bogert on bass.  Johnson had been in Weather Report, and had played with Cobham in the CBS All-Stars.  This slightly revised configuration of Bobby and the Midnites recorded the band's self-titled first album.

The Midnites did not play live again until the following year.  Brent Mydland and Matthew Kelly had left the lineup, and Dave Garland had joined.  Garland sang and played keyboards and saxophone.  Starting in January 1982, this group toured extensively when the Grateful Dead were not on the road.  A 60-minute concert video of this Midnites lineup was released on VHS in 1991.

On November 27, 1982, Bobby and the Midnites performed in Montego Bay at the Jamaica World Music Festival. They were one of many acts, including the Grateful Dead, the Clash, the B-52's, the English Beat, Ziggy Marley and the Melody Makers, Toots & the Maytals, Peter Tosh, and Aretha Franklin. The Midnites' set occurred after midnight of November 26, in the early hours of November 27. They played songs such as "Man Smart, Woman Smarter", "Heaven Help The Fool", "Thunder and Lighting", and "Book of Rules". Billy Cobham was given an introduction by the festival MC, and took an extended drum solo leading into "Josephine".

In March 1983, the band had its final change of personnel, when Kenny Gradney, formerly of Little Feat, replaced Johnson on bass.  The band continued touring, playing many live dates, and in 1984 released a second studio album.  The last Bobby and the Midnites concert was at the Rio, in Valley Stream, New York, on September 30, 1984.

After Bobby and the Midnites, Bob Weir's next non-Grateful Dead musical appearances were with Kingfish, sitting in on a number of concerts in 1984 and again in 1986.  Weir also played several solo acoustic shows in 1985.

Discography

Albums

Bobby and the Midnites (1981)
Where the Beat Meets the Street (1984)

Single

"Too Many Losers" / "Haze" (1981)

Concert video

Bobby and the Midnites (1991)

Personnel 

Following are the lineups for Bobby and the Midnites' live performances.

References

[ Bobby and the Midnites on Allmusic]
Bobby and the Midnites on DeadDisc.com
Pareles, Jon. Bobby and the Midnites concert review, New York Times, August 31, 1984
Rolling Stone biography of the Grateful Dead
San Francisco Chronicle, March 21, 2004. Selvin, Joel. "Dead Man Talking"
Scott, John W; Dolgushkin, Mike; Nixon, Stu. DeadBase XI: The Complete Guide to Grateful Dead Song Lists, 1999, DeadBase, pp. 476 – 481.

External links
Ratdog and Bob Weir official web site
Bobby Cochran official web site
Billy Cobham official web site
Alphonso Johnson official web site
Tim Bogert official web site

Rock music groups from California
Musical groups established in 1980
Musical groups disestablished in 1984
Grateful Dead
Arista Records artists
Columbia Records artists
Musical quartets
Bob Weir